Goure (fr. Gouré) is a town in southeastern Niger, Zinder Region, Goure Department, of which it is the seat.

Situation
Situated on the main all-weather east–west highway in Southern Niger, it is about 170 km east of regional capital, Zinder, on the route east to Diffa, N'Guigmi, and the Lake Chad area along Niger's border with Chad.  Around 40 km to the north of Goure are the Koutous hills, which form the first foothills of the Termit Massif.  These hills also mark the northeastern boundary of Hausa settlement in Niger, with the desert and hills to the north sparsely populated by seasonal nomadic encampments, and the area to the east populated by a majority of settled Kanouri ethnic groups and Toubou pastoralists.

Agriculture and environment
The surrounding land is mostly dry grass Sahel dotted with acacia trees, with green patches formed by kouris (seasonal watercourses with underground water) and cuvettes (natural depressions which retain seasonal rain water.  Farming is dominated by millet production.

The area around Goure is particularly threatened by desertification, and was in 2005 designated at the very northeastern edge of Nigerien farm land able to support its population. The area has thus become a centre for international anti-desertification efforts, where experiments by local and foreign organisations promote the use of windbreaks and scrub grids to fix soil and stop the influx of dunes.

The agricultural region around Goure was devastated at several points since independence, with major droughts in the early 1970s, the mid 1980s, and locust-induced crop loss famine in 1977 and 2005.

Population
The town has grown since the 1960s, with its importance as a weighstation on Niger's primary east–west highway.  In 1970, the town had a population of 2,124, 7,612 in 1977, 8,951 in 1985, and a population of 13,422 by 2001. Goure also has a landing strip, with ICAO Code DRZG.

References

 Population figures from citypopulation.de, citing (2001) Institut National de la Statistique du Niger.
 James Decalo. Historical Dictionary of Niger. Scarecrow Press/ Metuchen. NJ – London (1979)  p. 153
 Finn Fuglestad. A History of Niger: 1850–1960. Cambridge University Press (1983)  p. 133–140
 Jolijn Geels. Niger. Bradt UK/ Globe Pequot Press USA (2006)  pp. 223–224

Communes of Niger
Zinder Region